Tanja Slater (born 9 May 1978) is a road cyclist from United Kingdom. She represented her nation at the 2007 UCI Road World Championships.

Slater is married and has a BSc Hons, Sport & Exercise Science.

References

External links
 
 

1978 births
British female cyclists
Living people
Place of birth missing (living people)